Discography '93–'99 is a career-spanning compilation of tracks by Lethargy, a Rochester, New York-based mathcore band.

Track listing

Disc one
Subtle (3:29)
Stitch (3:43)
Little Man (2:59)
Image Tool (4:32)
Grope (4:10)
Careborne (3:19)
Humor Me (3:37)
Create (4:09)
Spill (5:44)
Erased (3:10)
Medley (7:32)
Spineless (4:14)
Thread (5:10
Among (3:38)
Humorless (6:24)

Disc two
Lost in This Existence (4:54)
The Entombment (3:50)
Among the Dead I Lie (4:13)
The Persistent Unknown (2:38)
Grieve into the Eyes that Bleed (5:14)
Tainted (3:33)
Sane (2:29)
Soil (2:36)
All Things End (3:47)
Distraught (3:51)
Humor Me (3:44)
Create (4:21)
A Moment Away (4:42)
Breathing You (4:59)
Thread (5:25)
"Jabba" (2:22)
Lost in This Existence (Unplugged) (4:32)

Notes
Disc one, tracks 1–3 were previously unreleased and were recorded in 1999.
Disc one, track 4 was taken from Watchmen Studios: The Compilation, released in 1997.
Disc one, track 5 was taken from Watchmen Studios: The Compilation Vol. 2, released in 1998.
Disc one, tracks 6–15 make up the album It's Hard to Write with a Little Hand, released in 1996.
Disc two, tracks 1–5 make up the Lost in This Existence demo, recorded in 1993.
Disc two, tracks 6-10 make up the Tainted demo, recorded in 1994.
Disc two, tracks 11–16 make up the Humor Me, You Funny Little Man (The Red Tape) demo, recorded in 1995.
Disc two, track 17 was taken from 7-inch split with Big Hair, released in 1994.

References

External links
Discography '93–'99 at Discogs

Lethargy (band) albums
2000 greatest hits albums
Albums recorded at Watchmen Recording Studios